The name Lo can be used as a shortened form of a number of names, such as Laura, Lauren, Dolores, Sloane, Olivia, Lucia, Lois, Lola, Loretta, Lorena or Loleriana. People named "Lo" include:
Lo Bosworth (born 1986), an American television personality
Lo Boutwell, a professional football player, played in the National Football League during 1922 and 1923
Lo La Chapelle (1888–1966), a Dutch footballer, played club football for amateur side HVV Den Haag
Lo Spagna (died 1529), a painter of the High-Renaissance, active in central Italy
Lo Walker (born 1933), the Republican mayor of Bossier City in northwestern Louisiana
Lo-ruhamah, the first daughter of the prophet Hosea and his wife Gomer in the Book of Hosea (1:6–8)

See also
L. O. Wenckebach (1895–1962), a Dutch sculptor, painter, and medallist